The 1939 State of the Union Address was given to the 76th United States Congress, on Wednesday, January 4, 1939, by Franklin D. Roosevelt, the 32nd United States president.  Foreseeing World War II, he said, "In Reporting on the state of the nation, I have felt it necessary on previous occasions to advise the Congress of disturbance abroad and of the need of putting our own house in order in the face of storm signals from across the seas. As this Seventy-sixth Congress opens there is need for further warning. 
A war which threatened to envelop the world in flames has been averted; but it has become increasingly clear that world peace is not assured."  On September 1, 1939, the War in Europe began.

References

State of the Union addresses
Presidency of Franklin D. Roosevelt
Speeches by Franklin D. Roosevelt
81st United States Congress
State of the Union Address
State of the Union Address
State of the Union Address
State of the Union Address
January 1939 events